Cayla Kluver is an American author known for her young adult trilogy series  Legacy, which she began writing while she was fourteen. Kluver originally self-published the series before it was picked up by AmazonEncore and later, Harlequin Teen. Kluver briefly attended Elizabethtown College for one year. Kluver lives in Eau Claire, Wisconsin.

Bibliography

Legacy
Legacy (2007 – AmazonEncore, 2011 – Harlequin Teen) 
Allegiance (2011 – Harlequin Teen)
Sacrifice (2012 – Harlequin Teen)

Heirs of Chrior
The Queen's Choice (2014)
The Empty Throne (2015)
Untitled third book (TBA)

References

External links
 

American women novelists
Living people
American young adult novelists
People from Eau Claire, Wisconsin
Novelists from Wisconsin
21st-century American novelists
21st-century American women writers
Elizabethtown College alumni
Women writers of young adult literature
Year of birth missing (living people)